WTYL may refer to:

 WTYL (AM), a radio station (1290 AM) licensed to Tylertown, Mississippi, United States
 WTYL-FM, a radio station (97.7 FM) licensed to Tylertown, Mississippi, United States